A wat is a monastery temple in Cambodia, Thailand or Laos.

Wat or WAT may also refer to:

People
 Wat (surname)
 Wat (given name), a list of people with the given name or nickname

Places
 List of wats in Thailand
 WAT, the IATA code for Waterford Airport in Ireland
 WAT, National Rail code for London Waterloo station in London, UK

Media and entertainment
 WaT, former Japanese pop duo
 WAT (album), by Slovenian industrial/techno music group Laibach
 Without a Trace, an American television show
 , the largest descriptive Afrikaans dictionary

Organizations
 Wendover Arm Trust, a charitable body with the aim of restoring the Wendover Arm Canal, England
 Williamsburg Area Transport, former name of Williamsburg Area Transit Authority
  ("Military University of Technology"), Warsaw, Poland
 World Association Training, a Girl Scouts program for refugee girls after World War II
 IAAF World Athletics Tour, a series of international track and field meets

Other uses
 Wat (food), an Eritrean and Ethiopian stew 
 West Africa Time, a time zone used in western and west-central Africa
 White adipose tissue, fatty tissue used for energy storage
 Windows Activation Technologies, an anti-piracy feature in Windows 7
 Wat, internet slang for "what"
 a term in computer programming for strange or unusual but intentional behaviour in programming languages
 .wat, a filename extension for the WebAssembly text format
Watzke–Allen test, a diagnostic test used in ophthalmology

See also
 Waat
 WUT (disambiguation)
 WATS (disambiguation)
 Watt (disambiguation)
 Watts (disambiguation)
 Wot (disambiguation)
 What (disambiguation)